Governor Islands may refer to:

 Governor Islands (South Orkney Islands) 
 Governor Islands (Western Australia)